Salulani Phiri (born 10 April 1994) is a Zambian international footballer who plays for Polokwane City, as a midfielder.

Club career
Phiri began his career at Zambian Premier League club Zanaco in 2012, winning two Zambian Premier League titles during his time with the club.

In December 2016, after weeks of rumours, Phiri agreed a deal to sign with South African Premier Division club Polokwane City at the end of his contract with Zanaco.

International career
On 5 December 2012, Phiri made his debut for Zambia in a 2–1 loss against Saudi Arabia.

In November 2015, Phiri was called-up by Zambia U23 manager Fighton Simukonda for the 2015 Africa U-23 Cup of Nations in Senegal.

International goals
Scores and results list Zambia goal tally first.

Honours
Zanaco
Zambian Premier League: 2012, 2016

References

1994 births
Living people
Sportspeople from Lusaka
Zambian footballers
Association football midfielders
Zambia international footballers
Zambia youth international footballers
Zanaco F.C. players
Polokwane City F.C. players
Zambian expatriate footballers
Zambian expatriates in South Africa
Zambian expatriate sportspeople in South Africa
Zambia Super League players
Zambia A' international footballers
2016 African Nations Championship players